Charniele LeRhonda Herring (born September 25, 1969) is an American politician. She has served in the Virginia House of Delegates since 2009, representing the 46th district, made up of portions of the city of Alexandria and Fairfax County, near Washington, D.C.

Herring is a member of the Democratic Party. She has been the House Democratic Caucus Chair since 2015 and in December 2012, she was the first African-American to be elected chair of the Democratic Party of Virginia. In 2020, she was elected to be the Majority Leader in the Virginia House of Delegates, making her the first woman and the first African-American to hold the position. After April 27, 2022, she was de facto minority leader following the ouster of Eileen Filler-Corn. The Democratic caucus did not immediately choose a replacement for Filler-Corn, but simultaneously voted to retain Herring as their caucus chair.  On June 1, 2022, Delegate Don Scott, who had called for the ouster of both Herring and Filler-Corn, was selected as minority leader.

Personal life, non-political career 
Herring was born in the Dominican Republic. A self-described "Army brat", she traveled frequently as a child. When she was 16 years old, her mother lost her job, and the two lived in a homeless shelter for six months.

Herring studied for three years with the Virginia Ballet School and Company. She earned a B.A. in economics from George Mason University in 1993 and a J.D. from the Columbus School of Law at The Catholic University of America in 1997.

Herring was a VISTA volunteer.

Political career
At age 13, during the presidency of Ronald Reagan, Herring testified before a government commission about health care coverage for military dependent children.

Virginia Governor Tim Kaine appointed Herring to the state's Council on the Status of Women. In 2006, she attended the Political Leaders Program at the University of Virginia's Sorensen Institute for Political Leadership.

Virginia House of Delegates
Delegate Brian Moran resigned his House seat on December 12, 2008 to spend full-time on his 2009 campaign for governor. Herring immediately announced her candidacy for the vacancy. In a caucus on December 16, Herring won the Democratic nomination, defeating Ariel Gonzalez, director of governmental affairs for the American College of Radiology, 191–43.

In the special election on January 13, 2009, she defeated Republican nominee Joe Murray, an aide to Representative Joe Wilson (R-SC), by 16 votes. Murray requested a recount, which was resolved in Herring's favor; she was sworn in on January 26.

Herring was the first African-American woman ever elected to represent Northern Virginia in the General Assembly. She was elected to serve as the Chairwoman of the Democratic Party in Virginia in 2012 and remained in the role until 2014. In 2015, she was elected Chair of the House Democratic Caucus. After the Democratic Party gained control of the House of Delegates in 2019, Herring was elected to serve as the Majority Leader. She is the first woman and African-American and served in this role until the Republicans regained control of the House of Delegates in 2021.

She currently serves as the chair of the Courts of Justice Committee, and she is the first woman and African-American to hold this role as well. She also serves as a member of the Rules committee and Joint Rules Subcommittee.

Herring has a lengthy career advocating for criminal justice reforms in Virginia, and after serving on the Crime Commission for 9 years, she was elected as the Chair of the committee in 2020.

Electoral history

See also
2009 Virginia House of Delegates election
2011 Virginia House of Delegates election

Notes

External links
 (campaign finance)

|-

1969 births
20th-century African-American people
20th-century African-American women
21st-century African-American women
21st-century African-American politicians
21st-century American politicians
21st-century American women politicians
African-American state legislators in Virginia
African-American women in politics
Columbus School of Law alumni
George Mason University alumni
Living people
Democratic Party members of the Virginia House of Delegates
Politicians from Alexandria, Virginia
Virginia lawyers
Women state legislators in Virginia